The 2013 Chevrolet Indy Dual in Detroit was the first doubleheader in IndyCar Series history, hosting Rounds 6 and 7 of the 2013 IndyCar Series season. Mike Conway won Race 1, and Simon Pagenaud won Race 2.

Race 1
Dario Franchitti got the pole for race 1, but was given a grid penalty. E. J. Viso would start 1st. Mike Conway won.

Mike Conway started on pole for race 2, attempting to sweep the weekend, but he finished 3rd. Simon Pagenaud won Race 2.

Notes
 Points include 1 point for leading at least 1 lap during a race, an additional 2 points for leading the most race laps, and 1 point for Pole Position.

Race 2

Notes
 Points include 1 point for leading at least 1 lap during a race, an additional 2 points for leading the most race laps, and 1 point for Pole Position.

Chevrolet Detroit Belle Isle Grand Prix
Chevrolet Detroit Belle Isle Grand Prix
Chevrolet Detroit Belle Isle Grand Prix
2013 in Detroit
Detroit Indy Grand Prix